The Scout and Guide movement in Lesotho is served by
 Lesotho Girl Guides Association, member of the World Association of Girl Guides and Girl Scouts
 Lesotho Scout Association, member of the World Organization of the Scout Movement

International Scouting units in Lesotho
In addition, there are American Boy Scouts in Lesotho, serving as Lone Scouts linked to the Direct Service branch of the Boy Scouts of America, which supports units around the world.